Dimitris Manolakis from the MIT Lincoln Laboratory was named Fellow of the Institute of Electrical and Electronics Engineers (IEEE) in 2016 for contributions to signal processing education, algorithms for adaptive filtering, and hyperspectral imaging.

References

Fellow Members of the IEEE
Living people
MIT Lincoln Laboratory people
Year of birth missing (living people)
Place of birth missing (living people)
American electrical engineers